"Keep On Doin'" is a song recorded by The Isley Brothers, who released the song from their 1970 album, Get into Something. Though the track's chart performance was modest at best, it would later inspire the funk instrumental, "The Grunt", recorded by James Brown's backing band at the time, The J.B.'s.

Overview

Recording
Following the early 1969 release of "It's Your Thing", which became a surprise smash hit for them, the Isley Brothers went through a period in 1969 where they went on a stringent recording and touring schedule, recording by day, touring by night, and then recording again after they had finished a show. Between January and December 1969, the brothers would record three consecutive studio albums, a live album, and organize to produce other acts for their T-Neck label, in which inspired by Motown Records and James Brown, they wanted to do things for themselves without the help of label assistance. During this period, Buddah Records agreed to distribute their records for the time being.

Though musically different from "It's Your Thing", the lyrics to "Keep On Doin'" didn't differ from the song as did several songs they would record for the albums, The Brothers: Isley and Get Into Something. This song was recorded in the summer of 1969 with the group's session musicians that they had hired to play on the recordings. Ernie Isley, who had played drums for the band during live gigs starting at age fourteen and had played bass on "It's Your Thing", continued to provide bass guitar work on this song. His other brother Marvin and brother-in-law and best friend Chris Jasper was not part of the recording.

Release
The record was the first single to be released off Get Into Something after Buddah Records picked the song for potential sales, passing over the lengthy title track. Possibly due to the song's repetitiveness, the song only got as high as #75 on the Billboard Hot 100, spending four weeks on the chart before dropping, while it landed at #17 on the R&B singles chart after its release in February 1970.

Later that year, James Brown had his band, The J.B.'s, which included original members William "Bootsy" and his brother Phelps "Catfish", record an instrumental of "Keep On Doin'". But instead of titling it as such and possibly to avoid a lawsuit by the Isley Brothers, renamed it "The Grunt" and added in different arrangements to help the song differ from the Isleys' original including Robert McCullogh screeching on his horn.

Little attention was given to the song at the time of its release in the summer of 1970. However, by a full decade later, hip-hop artists began sampling parts of the song, mainly McCullogh's horn parts including the famous screeching intro and the first horn break that occurred in the middle of the song. Also ironically, Brown credited himself and other members of the J.B.'s with writing the song. While Brown and some of the bandmates wrote their own parts, the Isley Brothers' name were left off of credit for "The Grunt", similar to Marva Whitney's recording of "It's My Thing", in which was a response song to "It's Your Thing" and Brown's song "My Thang" interpolating the melody from the same song.

Credits
Ronald Isley: lead vocals
O'Kelly Isley, Jr. and Rudolph Isley: background vocals
George Moreland: drums
Charles "Skip" Pitts: guitar
Ernie Isley: bass guitar
Everett Collins: keyboards
Horns arranged by The Isley Brothers

External links

1970 singles
Funk songs
The Isley Brothers songs
Songs written by O'Kelly Isley Jr.
Songs written by Rudolph Isley
Songs written by Ronald Isley
T-Neck Records singles